The 2008–09 season was Iraklis 28th consecutive (and 49th in total) season in the Super League Greece.

Transfers

In

Out

Club
ManagementKit

|
|
|

Other information

Pre-season and friendlies

Super League Greece

League table

Results summary

Results by round

Matches

Greek Cup

Matches

Player statistics
 Correct as of 26 April 2009
¹ Denotes player has left the club. ² Denotes player joined in the January transfer window.

References

Iraklis
Iraklis Thessaloniki F.C. seasons